The 1995 Pepsi Mega Bottlers season was the 6th season of the franchise in the Philippine Basketball Association (PBA).

Summary
The Bottlers won their first two games of the season, upsetting Alaska Milkmen, 99-93 in overtime on February 21, followed by a 94-80 win over San Miguel on February 28. The Mega Bottlers had four wins and two losses when they lost their last four games and were eliminated from the All-Filipino Cup semifinal race along with San Miguel Beermen and Ginebra.

Bob McCann, who played for three NBA teams spread over three years, was Pepsi's import in the Commissioners Cup. He scored 44 points in leading the Bottlers to a 91-87 win over Formula Shell in the opening game on June 9, spoiling the debut of the much-hype Shell reinforcement Jarvis Matthews.  The Bottlers lost all their remaining games with McCann being replaced by Kelbey Stuckey in their last three assignments.

Donnie Seale played two games in which Pepsi narrowly lost to Shell and Purefoods, Seale was sent home in favor of Gregory Guy, who lasted three games and also didn't impressed the coaching staff. Replacing Greg Guy was Derrick Canada. On October 15, Pepsi Mega won over Ginebra San Miguel, 112-106, in a match-up between the league's two doormat teams. The Bottlers close out their season campaign by winning their last game against Sta.Lucia Realtors, 97-91 on November 10.

Roster

Transactions

Trades

Additions

Recruited imports

References

TNT Tropang Giga seasons
Pepsi